Joan Abelove (born 1945) is an American writer of young adult novels. She attended Barnard College and has a PhD in cultural anthropology from the City University of New York. She spent two years in the jungles of Peru as part of her doctoral research and used the experience as background for her first novel, Go and Come Back (1998). Go and Come Back, about a young Peruvian girl's encounter with anthropologists, earned numerous awards and citations, including a "Best Books for Young Adults" selection of the American Library Association and "Book Prize Finalist" selection of the Los Angeles Times. Her second book, Saying It Out Loud, is about a Jewish girl coming to terms with her mother's death from brain cancer.

Joan Abelove participates in a critique group with Gail Carson Levine, writer of Ella Enchanted and Writing Magic, a guide for child authors who wish to make their stories better.

She now lives in New York City with her husband and son.

Bibliography
 Go and Come Back (1998), 
 Saying It Out Loud (1999), 
 Lost & Found: Award-Winning Authors Share Real-Life Experiences Through Fiction (contributor) (2000)

References 

 "Joan Abelove" in Contemporary Authors Online, Thomson Gale, entry updated October 22, 2003.

1945 births
Living people
American children's writers
Barnard College alumni
American women novelists
20th-century American novelists
20th-century American women writers
21st-century American women writers